Eshman-e Kamachal (also Romanized as Eshmān-e Kamāchāl, Ashmān Kāmchāl, and Eshmān Komāchāl; also known as Akhshām Chāl, Ashkāmchāl, Ashkām Chāl, Ashkemchal’, Eshkām-Chāl, and Komāchāl) is a village in Kiashahr Rural District, Kiashahr District, Astaneh-ye Ashrafiyeh County, Gilan Province, Iran. At the 2006 census, its population was 373, in 118 families.

References 

Populated places in Astaneh-ye Ashrafiyeh County